Shake Hands with the Devil: The Failure of Humanity in Rwanda is a book by Lieutenant-General Roméo Dallaire of the Canadian Forces, with help from Major Brent Beardsley. It was first published by Random House Canada in September 2003.

The book chronicles Dallaire's tour as Force Commander of the United Nations Assistance Mission for Rwanda (UNAMIR) in 1993–1994, during which he witnessed the 1994 Rwandan genocide.

The book won the 2003 Shaughnessy Cohen Award for Political Writing, and 2004 Governor General's Award for nonfiction.

The edition published in French is entitled J'ai serré la main du diable: La faillite de l'humanité au Rwanda.

The documentary film Shake Hands with the Devil: The Journey of Roméo Dallaire (2004) and a 2007 dramatic feature film are inspired by and in part based on the book. Dallaire was consulted in the making of both films.

Summary

More than 800,000 people are believed to have been killed in 100 days in the 1994 genocide in Rwanda. Lt. Gen. Roméo Dallaire witnessed these massacres. In Shake Hands with the Devil, he describes the dilemmas and atrocities to which he was exposed. 

In the book Dallaire explains how, after arriving in Kigali in August 1993, he warned the UN high authorities that he lacked sufficient equipment and manpower to carry out his mission. However, a lack of clarity in the UN's intervention procedures coupled with the international community's apparent lack of interest in Rwanda meant that Dallaire's calls for help went unanswered.

From day to day the situation deteriorates until eventually the general's forces are left on their own, without fuel, money or adequate equipment. Meanwhile, encouraged by the ethnic hate propaganda of the Radio Télévision Libre des Mille Collines (RTLM), Hutu militiamen attack their Tutsi victims while an army of exiles begins a civil war, from the northern border of the country, to take power. In Kigali, corpses of civilians killed by machetes begin piling up and many of the moderate politicians with whom Dallaire had the mandate to negotiate with are also murdered.

External links
 "About Shake Hands With the Devil: The Failure of Humanity in Rwanda."

2003 non-fiction books
21st-century history books
Canadian non-fiction books
Works about the Rwandan genocide
History books about the Rwandan genocide
History books about the United Nations
Works about the United Nations
Roméo Dallaire
Governor General's Award-winning non-fiction books
Non-fiction books adapted into films